Chen Hsiung-wen or Sherman Chen is a Taiwanese politician. He was the Minister of Labor from 20 August 2014 until 20 May 2016.

Early life and education
Chen earned his bachelor's degree in civil engineering and master's degree in environmental engineering from National Cheng Kung University. He is also known by the English name Sherman Chen.

Political career
Chen initially worked for the Kaohsiung City Government as the sub-division chief of the Public Works Bureau in 1984–1986, engineer of the Environmental Protection Bureau in 1986 and division chief of the same bureau in 1986–1989.

Chen then continued his work for the Environmental Protection Administration of the Executive Yuan as deputy director-general of the Department of Air Quality Protection and Noise Control in 1989–1992, director-general of the same department in 1992–2001, director of the Bureau of Environmental Inspection in 2001–2002, director-general of the Department of Waste Management in 2002–2005, inspector of the Recycling Fund Management Board in 2002–2004 and director-general of the Department of Comprehensive Planning in 2005–2006.

Mayor Hau Lung-pin named Chen a deputy mayor of Taipei in 2011. Chen was appointed Minister of Labor on 20 August 2014, and left office upon the inauguration of Tsai Ing-wen as president on 20 May 2016. In August 2019, Chen replaced  as deputy mayor of Kaohsiung. Chen concurrently chaired the Kaohsiung Election Commission.

References

Taiwanese Ministers of Labor
Living people
National Central University alumni
National Cheng Kung University alumni
1954 births
Taiwanese civil engineers
20th-century Taiwanese engineers
21st-century Taiwanese politicians
Deputy mayors of Taipei
Deputy mayors of Kaohsiung
Kuomintang politicians in Taiwan